The Rugby Club Cannes Mandelieu is a French rugby union club, based in Cannes and in Mandelieu-la-Napoule.

History
In 1993, the club was admitted to Group A of the French rugby union championship première division.  However, after just one season, the club was relegated to a lower division.

After the 2005–2006 season, the club was relegated to the Fédérale 2, and a year later to the Fédérale 3.

In 2008, they won the Fédérale 3 division title, returning to the Fédérale 2, remaining there only for one season. They were relegated to the Fédérale 3 again, and it was discovered that the club had misused public funds from the Manedeliu municipality.

Awards 
 Champion of Fédérale 3: 2007/08

Other competitions 
 Finalist du Challenge of l'Espérance (1): 1996/97

Famous Players
 John Herman
 Franck Montanella
 Boursier Sébastien
 Nicola Cavaliere

References 

French rugby union clubs